KK Zadar history and statistics in FIBA Europe and Euroleague Basketball (company) competitions.

European competitions

Record 
KK Zadar has overall from 1965–66 (first participation) to 2010–11 (last participation): 180 wins against 187 defeats plus 2 draws in 369 games for all the European club competitions.

 EuroLeague: 44–76 (120)
 FIBA Saporta Cup: 33–26 plus 1 draw (60) /// EuroCup Basketball: 35–32 (67)
 FIBA Korać Cup: 59–38 plus 1 draw (98) /// FIBA EuroChallenge: 9–15 (24)

See also 
 Yugoslav basketball clubs in European competitions

External links
FIBA Europe
EuroLeague
ULEB
EuroCup

KK Zadar
Zadar